Rowland Burdon  may refer to:

Rowland Burdon (1857–1944), MP for Sedgefield
Rowland Burdon (died 1838) (c. 1757–1838), MP for County Durham